Kareem Ahmed (born 17 February 2007) is an Egyptian footballer who plays as a midfielder or forward for Liverpool.

Club career
Born in England to Egyptian parents, Ahmed's performances for a local amateur side caught the attention of Premier League sides Everton, Manchester City and Liverpool. He accepted an offer from the latter, stating that his decision was influenced by the fact that his idol, Mohamed Salah, played for Liverpool.

He progressed well through Liverpool's academy, and would mark his debut for the under-18 team with a goal against Bournemouth in the FA Youth Cup - bundling the ball into the net after teammate Wellity Lucky's header was initially saved.

International career
In February 2022, Ahmed was called up to training camps with the Egyptian youth team.

References

2007 births
Living people
Egyptian footballers
Egypt youth international footballers
English footballers
English people of Egyptian descent
Association football midfielders
Association football forwards
Liverpool F.C. players